Stefano David (1 January 1636 – 1687) was a Roman Catholic prelate who served as Bishop of Krk (1684–1687).

Biography
Stefano David was born in Caorle, Italy on 1 January 1636 and ordained a priest on 21 December 1658. On 19 June 1684, he was appointed during the papacy of Pope Alexander VII as Bishop of Krk. On 25 June 1684, he was consecrated bishop by Alessandro Crescenzi (cardinal), Cardinal-Priest of Santa Prisca, with Giuseppe Bologna, Archbishop Emeritus of Benevento, and Francesco Maria Giannotti, Bishop of Segni, serving as co-consecrators. He served as Bishop of Krk until his death in 1687.

References 

17th-century Roman Catholic bishops in Croatia
Bishops appointed by Pope Alexander VII
1636 births
1687 deaths